Jilin Aodong Medicine Industry Group Company Limited is a state-owned enterprise in Dunhua, Jilin, China. It involves in the manufacture and sale of Chinese patent drugs and pharmaceutical packaging products, and the collection of traffic tolls and the road engineering construction business. It was established in 1993 and listed on the Shenzhen Stock Exchange in 1996.

References

External links
Jilin Aodong Medicine Industry Group Company Limited

Companies listed on the Shenzhen Stock Exchange
Pharmaceutical companies established in 1993
Companies based in Jilin
Pharmaceutical companies of China
Government-owned companies of China
Chinese companies established in 1993
Chinese brands